Tanging Yaman (International Title: A Change of Heart) is a 2000 Filipino religious-family drama film produced by Star Cinema. Directed by Laurice Guillen, the film garnered several awards, especially at the 2000 Metro Manila Film Festival, including Best Picture, Best Actor, and Best Actress.

The film's title came from a liturgical composition by Manoling Francisco, SJ and sung by Carol Banawa. Gloria Romero, who portrayed the loving and devout Lola Loleng, previously collaborated with director Laurice Guillen in the 1980 film Kasal where she played Elisa, Grace's mother and the 1990 drama film adapted from a radio drama, Kapag Langit ang Humatol where she played the abusive and violent matriarch Octavia Villaroel.

The success of this religious-family drama film was followed ten years later by Sa 'yo Lamang, also directed by Laurice Guillen. The film was digitally restored and remastered in high-definition in 2014 by the ABS-CBN Film Archives and Central Digital Lab. The restored version received its television premiere on April 3, 2015 (Good Friday), 9:30PM on ABS-CBN.

Plot
The film revolves around three siblings separated by both physical and emotional distance, three siblings, the unemployed Danny (Johnny Delgado), the high-maintenance Art (Edu Manzano) and financially unstable Grace (Dina Bonnevie) and their mother Dolores "Loleng" Rosales (Gloria Romero). All three live separately with their spouses and children: Danny, a former tricycle driver, resides in Pampanga and takes care of their mother, Art lives in Manila, and Grace in the U.S.

After Loleng and Carina (Shaina Magdayao) attend Mass, Danny's firstborn Boyet (Marvin Agustin), 
a law student, arrives at the Rosales ancestral home. Whilst having dinner, Danny suggests that Boyet prepare a bio-data so that he can work for the municipal hall. Just as they discuss, Loleng complains that she cannot taste nor smell the fried eggplant made by Danny's wife Celine (Hilda Koronel).

Despite being in the U.S., Grace - who ran away from Pampanga to marry Francis (Joel Torre), who works as a mailman - has a strained relationship with her husband and struggles with a meager salary, which is used to cover the tuition fees of her children Madeleine (Janette McBride) and Andrew (John Prats). When Francis gives her an expensive anniversary present, she goes livid and they argue again over their finances in public.

Later, just as Art gives part of his salary to Loleng, she gives most to Danny, to Art's displeasure. Celine comes to Danny's defense, saying he returns what he borrows to Loleng. As Art leaves, Boyet joins him. Upon arriving home, he finds photos taken by his son Rommel (Jericho Rosales), and voices his disapproval, as he wants him to be a doctor.

Danny then comes with a friend at the municipal hall, a real estate agent, who is looking for a large tract of land. Danny then considers the 80-hectare tract of land left to them by their deceased father, to which Loleng objects initially, given the promise made to the patriarch, but is talked into doing so by Danny. He then calls Grace, taking mention of the sum that would be earned by the sale (P1 million per hectare) would cover whatever expenses Grace would have with flying back to the country, more so as Loleng is turning 75. Grace quickly agrees, but not Art, who demands they honor the promise.

Following a reflection on her children's problems, Loleng suffers a stroke at a mass and is taken to a hospital, where Danny and Art discover that she has Alzheimer's disease. Upon getting the news, Grace suggests they sell the tract of land so they could settle the finance. Loleng is later discharged but Art later tells Danny and Celine that he has taken her to his residence for treatment. Whilst packing Loleng's belongings, Danny and Celine both break down over how the disease will affect Loleng entirely.

Art later agrees to the sale, but Danny gets no part of the earnings that would be gained. Danny, who then comes to contemplate if the sale was in good faith, later suggests that Boyet continue his studies at Pampanga, to which Boyet reveals that Art has offered a part-time job to him. When Danny tries to tell Boyet of the grudge Art holds against Danny, he lashes out at him, saying he doesn't want to be a tricycle driver like him, after which he is admonished by Celine for his callousness. They patch things up later on.

Grace, Madeleine, and Andrew then depart for Manila, leaving Francis. Boyet and Chona (Carol Banawa) come to Art's house as well to see Loleng. When Chona sings "Panunumpa", Loleng recognizes it and Chona, after which Chona embraces her grandmother and tells her that she passed an audition for college scholarship. However, after a discussion on the land sale, Loleng has an episode and says that she wants to return home. By then, she does not recognize Art as well.

Upon going to Pampanga, Grace reunites with Danny. She then regrets agreeing to selling the tract of land - which could have sold her soul in exchange for money and was against the father's will - and with Danny, they agree not to sell it. Meanwhile, Madeleine falls in love with one of Boyet's friends, Joel (Dominic Ochoa).

At her 75th birthday, Loleng has another episode and lashes out at Art, who then berates his mother for always favoring Danny, and Grace for betraying him, and lamenting about his troubled past - their father was very strict towards Art - culminating in Art declaring that Danny will receive no part of the earnings of the sale, and Danny punching him as revenge for his selfishness. Art's family storms out soon after.

Madeleine is later mistaken by Loleng for Grace, and is brought to Loleng's room, where she shows her wedding dress, that she would have given to Grace for her marriage to Francis, and days that she has accepted her love. Grace, who was just at a distance, overhears this and becomes emotional.

It is later revealed that Rommel has not attended medical school for a month, and over that Art becomes furious. Rommel tries to reason but it ends in Art lashing out at him before Rommel locks the door and breaks down in helplessness. He then tries to leave for Pampanga, but he and his car are caught in the middle of a flood. Danny quickly comes to the scene and tells Art of the terrible news.

Upon driving, Art laments over what happened, that he followed whatever his father said, despite not loving him, and that he's upset towards him and God. Danny then explains that God and their father loved him even with the hardships they brought. Art then apologizes for his misdeeds and reconciles with Danny, while Rommel is miraculously rescued. Danny, Art, and Boyet all return to the Rosales home where they all reunite with Rommel and rejoice over his rescue. Loleng, from a distance, as she sees her family united anew, smiles and thanks God.

The film ends with Art contemplating his past actions, Grace reconciling with Francis in the U.S., and Danny and Celine dancing and planning on where they should go for vacation.

Cast
Gloria Romero as Lola Loleng. The mother of Danny, Arturo and Grace.
Dina Bonnevie as Grace. The youngest child of Loleng
Edu Manzano as Arturo. The second child of Loleng
Johnny Delgado as Danny. The eldest child of Loleng
Hilda Koronel as Celine. Danny's wife
Joel Torre as Francis. Grace's husband
Cherry Pie Picache as Nanette. Arturo's wife
Marvin Agustin as Boyet. Danny and Celine's eldest and only son
Jericho Rosales as Rommel. Arturo and Nanette's eldest son. Arturo wants him to become a doctor.
CJ Ramos as John-John. Arturo and Nanette's youngest son
Shaina Magdayao as Carina. Danny and Celine's youngest child and second daughter
John Prats as Andrew. Grace and Francis son
Carol Banawa as Chona. Danny and Celine's second child and first daughter.
Dominic Ochoa as Joel. Madeleine's love interest
Janette McBride as Madeleine. Grace and Francis daughter
Rolaine Kaye Surposa as Opera
Felindo Obach as Chief of Police

Production

Pre-production

Casting

Release
The film was released on December 25, 2000, as one of the entries for the 2000 Metro Manila Film Festival. The film won nine awards including Best Picture, Best Director for Laurice Guillen, and Best Actress for Gloria Romero. It was later given a re-release on April 4, 2001.

Home media and television broadcast
The film's restored version became available in iTunes on November 16, 2015, in selected territories including the Philippines, Japan, and Hong Kong.

ABS-CBN premiered the restored version on April 3, 2015, at 9:30PM as part of their Holy Week film presentation for Good Friday. According to Kantar Medita-TNS statistics, the showing attained a nationwide audience rating of 10.2%, lost to GMA Network's showing of 2012 drama film Mga Mumunting Lihim, which attained a 11.6% nationwide rating.

On December 16, 2018, ABS-CBN re-aired the film's restored version as a feature presentation of the network's Sunday late-night block, Sunday's Best. The showing received a 3.4% nationwide household rating, 0.4% greater than GMA Network's SNBO broadcast of the 2011 Chinese film The Guardsman that attained a 3.0% rating.

Spin-off series
Tanging Yaman became a spin-off television series that airs every Saturday on ABS-CBN from June 8, 2002, to 2003 replacing Ang Munting Paraiso starring Marvin Agustin and the whole ensemble casts.

Accolade

References

External links

2000 films
2000s Tagalog-language films
Filipino-language films
Films about Filipino families
Films directed by Laurice Guillen
Films set in the Philippines
Star Cinema films